Chamaesphegina macra is a species of Hoverfly in the family Syrphidae.

Distribution
Chile.

References

Eristalinae
Insects described in 1938
Diptera of South America
Taxa named by Günther Enderlein
Endemic fauna of Chile